Chie no umi ("The Oceans of Wisdom") is a chūban yoko-e (19 × 25.4 cm) sized woodblock print series by the Japanese artist Hokusai. The ten fishing-themed prints comprise one of Hokusai's rarest sets. Published by Moriya Jihei, it seems to have been issued around 1832–1834 and publication of the prints ceased abruptly. Some preparatory drawings are extant for prints that were never made.

The prints, which feature scenes of fishing including shellfish-gathering, whaling and fly-fishing, allow Hokusai to explore one of his favourite themes, that of man expressing himself through labour and harmoniously working with the forces of nature. This is particularly evident in the print Chōshi in Shimōsa Province, which shows fishing boats struggling in a stormy sea, echoing his roughly contemporaneous The Great Wave off Kanagawa.

The series' use of colour differs from other landscape prints of the time. It has richly overprinted shades and an unusual palette of yellow, green and varying red pigments. Hokusai also employs the rare technique of using black for colour and not just line, suggestive of the influence of Western oil painting.

Title 
The title of the series can be read in two ways. The characters  read as "One Thousand Pictures of the Ocean" (or "One Thousand Pictures of the Sea"), but when read aloud the title sounds like "Oceans of Wisdom".

Prints

Notes

References

External links
 Auction for Soshu Tonegawa at Christie's

Works by Hokusai
1830s prints
Ships in art